Orilla/Pumpkin Bay Water Aerodrome  is located on Lake Couchiching adjacent to Orillia, Ontario, Canada.

See also
 Orillia Airport
 Orillia/Lake St John Water Aerodrome

References

Registered aerodromes in Ontario
Transport in Orillia
Seaplane bases in Ontario